John Montgomery Traherne (5 October 1788 – 5 February 1860), FRS, FSA, FGS, FLS, was a Welsh Anglican priest, antiquarian, magistrate and Deputy Lieutenant of County of Glamorgan. His best known work is Historical Notices of Sir Matthew Craddock of Swansea.

Early years
The only son of Llewelyn Traherne, High Sheriff of Glamorgan, he was born at Coedarhydyglyn in 1788, near what is now Culverhouse Cross, western Cardiff. His mother was Charlotte (died 1791), the daughter of John Edmonds, Esq. of St Hilary. There were three sisters, Charlotte-Frances, Maria-Eleanor, Louisa. In 1799, during his father's lifetime, Traherne was virtually adopted by his great-aunt, Mrs. John Llewellin, who paid the expenses of his education at private schools and tutors until he entered at Oriel College, Oxford, in April 1807, where he was taught by Edward Copleston, then tutor, afterwards head of that College, and subsequently Bishop of Llandaff. While a student, he made the acquaintance of Rev. Thomas Rackett (1757–1841), Rector of Spetisbury and Charlton, Co. Dorset, and from him developed an interest for topographical and antiquarian studies. It was Rackett who introduced Traherne to members of the literary and scientific circles of London. Traherne took his B.A. degree in 1810 and M.A. 1813.

Career
He was ordained deacon in 1812, and priest in 1813, both times by Richard Beadon, Bishop of Bath and Wells. From 1817 to 1820, he entered into politics in Glamorgan while serving as a magistrate. From 1844 to 1851, he was chancellor of the Diocese of Llandaff and the Llandaff Cathedral. He was a Fellow of the Royal Society, Society of Antiquaries of London, Linnean Society of London, and the Geological Society of London; as well as an Honorary Member of the Society of Antiquaries of Newcastle upon Tyne, and of the Royal Society of Antiquaries, Copenhagen. Like his wife, Traherne was dedicated to history and literature, and under various pseudonyms, he produced works on local and south Welsh history, the best known of which is Historical Notices of Sir Matthew Craddock of Swansea. He frequently contributed to the "Archaeologia" and other similar works.

Personal life
On inheriting his family estate in 1823, he demolished the old house at Coedarhydyglyn and erected a Regency villa. He also arranged for the 1838 restoration of the St. Georges-super-Ely village church. Traherne also became lord of the manor and church of St Hilary; his mother's family had purchased the manor in 1758.

On 23 April 1830, Traherne married Charlotte-Louisa, third daughter of Thomas Mansel Talbot of Margam, and sister of Christopher Rice Mansel Talbot, Lord-Lieutenant and M.P. for the County of Glamorgan. Traherne died at Coedarhydyglyn in 1860, childless. The 123 volumes of the Traherne-Mansel Franklen Manuscripts, which he compiled over the years, are now in the possession of the National Archives of Wales.

Partial works
 Historical notices of sir Matthew Cradock, knt, (1840)
 Stradling correspondence: a series of letters written in the reign of Queen Elizabeth, with notices of the family of Stradling of St. Donat's Castle, Co. Glamorgan, (1840)

References

External links
 John Montgomery Traherne at Worldcat

1788 births
1860 deaths
19th-century Welsh Anglican priests
Clergy from Cardiff
Welsh antiquarians
19th-century Welsh historians
Alumni of Oriel College, Oxford
Deputy Lieutenants of Glamorgan
Fellows of the Royal Society
Fellows of the Society of Antiquaries of London
Fellows of the Geological Society of London